James J. Brady (January 10, 1878 – ?) was the Illinois state auditor of public accounts from 1913 to 1917.

Born in Chicago, Illinois, Brady worked for the Western Telegraph Company. From 1913 to 1917, Brady served as Illinois Auditor of Public Accounts and was a Democrat. He was a candidate for the Illinois state treasurer in 1918.

References

1878 births
Year of death unknown
Politicians from Chicago
Auditors of Public Accounts of Illinois
Illinois Democrats